Khaled Al-Barakah (born December 5, 1990) is a Saudi professional footballer who plays as a left back for Al-Hazem.

Honours
Al-Hazem
MS League: 2020–21

References

External links 
 

1990 births
Living people
People from Ar Rass
Association football fullbacks
Saudi Arabian footballers
Al-Hazem F.C. players
Hajer FC players
Al-Ahli Saudi FC players
Ettifaq FC players
Saudi First Division League players
Saudi Professional League players